Yuzhong District is the central district and heart of Chongqing municipality. It is the capital of the municipality and is also the political, economical, and entertainment center of the city of Chongqing. Located in the central portion of Yuzhong is the Jiefangbei CBD, a leading business and financial center of western China.

Surrounded on three sides by water, Yuzhong is effectively a peninsula between the Jialing and Yangtze Rivers. Due to the limited space, its hilly nature, and the fact that it is the main central business district for Chongqing, Yuzhong contains some of the tallest skyscrapers in China and is the most densely populated district in the municipality.

During the Second Sino-Japanese War, the relocated headquarters of the Nationalist Government were located in Yuzhong.

Administrative divisions

Economy
Yuzhong District is the economic center of Chongqing. In 2015, the region's GDP reached 95.8 billion Yuan, the per capita GDP reached 147,524 Yuan, retail sales reached 141.6 billion Yuan. The number of commercial banks in the district and municipal financial institutions reached 18, including HSBC, Standard Chartered, and Bank of East Asia. The largest western China commercial area, Jiefangbei central business district, has brought together 90 percent of the domestic financial institutions in Chongqing, as well as two-thirds of Chongqing’s foreign banks and insurance agencies. Three-quarters of the world’s top 500 enterprises in Chongqing and many foreign consular offices are also located here.

Education

Chongqing Bashu Secondary School, once called Bashu Middle School (巴蜀中学) is a secondary school located in the Huanghuayuan area. Founded in 1933, it educates students aged 12–18. Its motto is 公正诚朴 (Selflessness, Justice, Honesty and Simplicity).

Transport

Metro
Yuzhong is currently served by four metro lines operated by Chongqing Rail Transit:
 - Xiaoshizi , Jiaochangkou , Qixinggang, Lianglukou , Eling, Daping , Shiyoulu
 - Jiaochangkou , Linjiangmen, Huanghuayuan, Daxigou, Zengjiayan, Niujiaotuo , Liziba, Fotuguan, Daping 
 - Lianglukou , Niujiaotuo 
 - Xiaoshizi

References

External links
 Chongqing Yuzhong District Government website
 Chongqing Yuzhong District Government website
 

 
Districts of Chongqing
Economy of Chongqing